Valley Forge is a 1934 play by Maxwell Anderson, about the winter that George Washington spent in Valley Forge. Philip Merivale played Washington in the original production and Richard Basehart played him in the Hallmark Hall of Fame television version based on the play.

See also
 Cultural depictions of George Washington
 List of plays and musicals about the American Revolution

1934 plays
Plays based on actual events
Plays set in Pennsylvania
Plays by Maxwell Anderson
Valley Forge
Cultural depictions of George Washington